Lakhan Singh Meena (born 1 January 1964) is a member of the Rajasthan Legislative Assembly from Karauli constituency.

References

1964 births
Living people
People from Karauli district
Rajasthan MLAs 2018–2023
Indian National Congress politicians from Rajasthan